Valetudo may refer to:

 The Roman name for the Greek goddess Hygieia
 Valetudo (moon), a moon of the planet Jupiter, also known as Jupiter LXII

See also
 Vale tudo, a Brazilian full-contact combat event
 Vale Tudo (TV series), a 1988 Brazilian telenovela